Verticordia plumosa, commonly known as plumed featherflower, is a flowering plant in the myrtle family, Myrtaceae and is endemic to the south-west of Western Australia. It was the first species in the genus to be described, although initially given the name Chamelaucium plumosum. It is a shrub with linear leaves and rounded groups of scented pink, mauve or white flowers. Two varieties of this species have been declared as being "threatened".

Description
Flowering time differs, depending on the variety.

Taxonomy and naming
This species was first formally described by René Louiche Desfontaines in 1839 and given the name Chamelaucium plumosum. The description was published in Mémoires du Muséum d'Histoire Naturelle. In 1917, George Druce changed the name to Verticordia plumosa and the change was published in a supplement of The Botanical Exchange Club and Society of the British Isles Report.

Details of the specimens  used in the first description of the species are uncertain. The plant was probably first collected by Archibald Menzies, October 1791 and the type collection may have been made in 1803 by Jean Leschenault. Both collections were probably made at the King George Sound, Western Australia. William Baxter collected another early specimen in 1829. The plant was also given the name Verticordia fontanesii by Augustin de Candolle in 1828 but that nomination is no longer accepted.

The specific epithet (plumosa) is derived from the Latin word pluma meaning "feather", referring to the feathery sepals.

In a revision of the genus Verticordia in 1991, Alex George placed this species in subgenus Verticordia, section Verticordia, along with V. crebra, V. harveyi, V. helichrysantha, V. stenopetala, V. sieberi, V. pityrhops and V. fimbrilepis.

He also recognised the following varieties:
Verticordia plumosa (Desf.) Druce var. plumosa 
Verticordia plumosa var. ananeotes A.S. George (1991)
Verticordia plumosa var. brachyphylla (Diels) A.S.George 
Verticordia plumosa var. grandiflora (Bentham) A.S.George 
Verticordia plumosa var. incrassata A.S.George
Verticordia plumosa var. pleiobotrya A.S.George
Verticordia plumosa var. vassensis A.S.George

A variant, known as 'Eric John', appears to be an intergeneric cross between V. plumosa and Chamelaucium floriferum.

Habit and distribution 
Plumed featherflower mainly occurs in near-coastal areas from the Arrowsmith River to areas east of Esperance but the variety intercrassa is found well inland to areas near Newdegate and Hyden.

Conservation
The varieties ananeotes and vassensis are classified as "Threatened Flora (Declared Rare Flora — Extant)" by the Western Australian Government Department of Parks and Wildlife

References

plumosa
Endemic flora of Western Australia
Myrtales of Australia
Rosids of Western Australia
Plants described in 1819